Alonso de Peralta (died 1614) was a Roman Catholic prelate who served as Archbishop of La Plata o Charcas (1609–1614).

Biography
On 14 Jan 1609, Alonso de Peralta was appointed during the papacy of Pope Paul V as Archbishop of La Plata o Charcas.
On 30 Nov 1609, he was consecrated bishop by Francisco García Guerra, Archbishop of México, with Diego Vázquez de Mercado, Archbishop of Manila, serving as co-consecrators. 
He served as Archbishop of La Plata o Charcas until his death on 3 Dec 1614.

References

External links and additional sources
 (for Chronology of Bishops) 
 (for Chronology of Bishops) 

17th-century Roman Catholic bishops in Bolivia
Bishops appointed by Pope Paul V
1614 deaths
Roman Catholic archbishops of Sucre